The 2001 Buckinghamshire Council election took place on 7 June 2001 to elect members of Buckinghamshire County Council in England. The whole council was up for election and the Conservative Party stayed in overall control of the council.

The election had been postponed from 3 May to be held at the same time as the 2001 general election. Several councillors stood down at the election including the chairman, Ken Ross, and a former Conservative group leader, Mark Greenburgh. The results saw the Conservative make two gains to hold 40 of the 54 seats.

Election result

|}

Council Composition

After the election, the composition of the council was:

References

2001
2001 English local elections
2000s in Buckinghamshire
June 2001 events in the United Kingdom